This is a list of awards and nominations received by American DJ musical group Jack Ü.

American Music Awards

|-
| rowspan="1"| 2015 || rowspan="1"| "Where Are Ü Now"  || Collaboration of the Year ||

Grammy Awards

|-
| rowspan="2"| 2016 || rowspan="1"| Skrillex and Diplo Present Jack Ü || Best Dance/Electronic Album || 
|-
| "Where Are Ü Now"  || Best Dance Recording ||

International Dance Music Awards

|-
| rowspan="7"|2016 
| "Febreze" 
| Best Rap/Hip Hop/Trap Dance Track
| 
|-
| rowspan="4"| "Where Are Ü Now" 
| Best Dubstep/Drum & Bass Track
| 
|-
| Best Commercial/Pop Dance Track
| 
|-
| Best Featured Vocalist Performance - Title, Vocalist/Artist
| 
|-
| Best Music Video
| 
|-
| rowspan="2"| Skrillex and Diplo Present Jack Ü
| Best Dubstep/Drum & Bass DJ
| 
|-
| Best Artist (Group)
| 
|}

MTV Video Music Awards

|-
| rowspan="4"| 2015 || rowspan="4"| "Where Are Ü Now"  || Best Visual Effects || 
|-
| Best Art Direction || 
|-
| Best Editing || 
|-
| Song of the Summer ||

NRJ Music Awards

References 

Jack U
Jack U
Diplo